Rhadinosaurus (meaning "slender lizard") is a genus of nodosaurid ankylosaur first described in 1881 by Harry Govier Seeley, based on remains uncovered in Austria sometime between 1859 and 1870 by Edward Suess and Pawlowitsch. It was a herbivore that lived around 84.9 to 70.6 million years ago (during the Late Cretaceous period). The type species is R. alcimus.

Fossils
The Rhadinosaurus hypodigm (holotype) consists of one tibia fragment, one limb fragment, two fibulae, and two dorsal vertebrae. The fibulae (PIUW 2349/34), which are clearly ankylosaurian, were originally identified as femora in the original description, but were eventually re-identified in a 2001 review of ankylosaur specimens from the Grünbach Formation. Sachs and Hornung (2006) re-identified one of the putative humeral bones (PIUW 2348/35) as a tibial fragment of an rhabdodontid ornithopod dinosaur, referring it to Zalmoxes sp.

Taxonomy
Rhadinosaurus was initially classified as a dinosaur of uncertain position, and later considered an ornithosuchid as well as possible synonym of Doratodon, until Franz Nopcsa introduced the now popular theory that classifies it as a probable synonym of Struthiosaurus.

References 

Campanian life
Late Cretaceous dinosaurs of Europe
Cretaceous Austria
Fossils of Austria
Fossil taxa described in 1881
Taxa named by Harry Seeley
Nomina dubia
Ornithischian genera